Asana River (Río Asana) is a waterway in the Moquegua Region of southern Peru. It is one of the tributaries of the Osmore River (also known as Moquegua or Tumilaca). The Asana archaeological site, occupied over the course of 8,000 years, is situated in a basin on the river's north bank. The Quellaveco mining project sought to divert the Asana for extractive waste material placement in its copper mining operations.

Geography
The Asana River is one of the four major tributaries of the Moquegua. It is situated in the south central Andes mountains. This is within the pampas in the peripheral region of the high puna, defined as an area (Pampa Tinajones and Apachita Limani) above  elevation. The river's runoff source is seasonal precipitation including snow melt from the western cordillera of the Andes.

One of the Asana's tributaries is the Charaque. After their confluence, the stream becomes known as Coscori. The Capillune is a tributary of the Asana. Stream discharge during the rainy season averages /second while in the dry season, the average was /second.

Ecologically the entire Asana River valley is fragile and subject to landslides. The river flows through two environmental regions. One is the puna region above  elevation where the climate is colder and the rainfall is also higher compared to the lower elevation areas. The valleys in this range are narrow. In the flat valley where the Asana archaeological site is located, the geological and geomorphological features are causative factors for its existence.

Flora

The lower sierra region of the Asana river valley has four plant communities; evergreen shrubs and sparsely distributed molle trees (schinus molle); perennial shrubs of Franseria meyeniana; grasses and herbs such as Chenopodium petiolare and grain quinoa (Chenopodium quinoa). Growth and yield of these plants are dependent on the rainfall.

The upper high sierra zone has 14 plant communities. Some of the species are Fabiana weberbauerii, Balbisia-Verbena Diplostephium, Cherodesma and tola (Parastrephia lepidophyllum) pampa, stipa ichu, quenua (Polylepis besseri), and in the High Sierra – Bofedales (Distchia moor).

In the puna rim (elevation ), the plant species are in the pampa dryland consisting of pampa and bunch grasses, and wetlands of bofedal and puna desert which is barren land. In the puna rim area, 32 species have been recorded in the dry and wetland areas. The dryland species are bunch grass species of Calamagrostits amonea, Calamagrostits bereifolia, stipa ichu, and shrub species of Parastrephia lepidopyhylum, Parastrephia lucida, Baccharis macrophylla, Chersodoma iodopappa, cactus (Opuntia atacamenis) at high altitudes, two woody plants of Azorella compacta (yareta), Polylepis besseri. The wetland species are mats of Distichia muscoides, Oxychloe andinum (khuli) over which the grasses that flourish are Calamagrostis crysantha and Calamagrostis rigescens.

Fauna

There are several herbivores in the Asana valley. Recorded from the pre-historic period, are guanaco (Lama guanicoe) in an elevation range of  feeding on grasses, forbs and shrubs, and subsisting in arid conditions. Vicuna (Vicugna vicugna) and Lama vicugna are Andean camelids found in the elevation range of ) which forage on vegetation of bofedal in this region. Smaller species found are vizcacha (Lagidium viscacia).

Mining
In the 1960s, when the Southern Peru Copper Corporation began copper mining in the region, the Asana River valley was tapped for mining operations. The Quellaveco Company (a consortium of Anglo-American Company of South Africa and International Finance Corporation of the World Bank) operated here since 1992. However, the environmental impact assessment (EIA) carried out by Quellaveco confirmed the negative impact of this diversion. The EIA suggested that an unacceptable level of water resource exploitation would occur. Other issues noted were resettlement of local population as well as the pollution of aquifers and land area caused by discharge of tailing effluents. During 2002–03, the local population held protests against the diversion project in view of its large negative impacts. As of 2007, no license had been issued for this project.

References

Bibliography

Rivers of Peru
Rivers of Moquegua Region